"Arms of Mary" is a song written by Iain Sutherland and performed by Sutherland Brothers and Quiver. It was a 1976 international hit single for the band; the Glasgow Herald in its obituary for Iain Sutherland described "Arms of Mary" as "a plaintive and radio-friendly folk-rock ballad in which the narrator reminisces over the woman he first made love to."

Original version
Iain Sutherland would recall writing "Arms of Mary" at the family farmhouse in the Stoke-on-Trent village of Stockton Brook, adding: "The stuff about 'the lights shine down the valley' [the opening line], I was looking down through Endon basically", citing the village of Endon situated in the Churnet Valley. "Arms of Mary" was introduced on the September 1975 album release Reach for the Sky which marked the debut of the Sutherland Brothers and Quiver on CBS Records: Iain Sutherland would comment: "The main reason we left [previous label] Island [Records] was because they wouldn't distribute singles from our albums in the United States." (In fact the group had reached No. 48 on the Billboard Hot 100 in 1973 with the Island release "(I Don't Want to Love You But) You Got Me Anyway").

Subsequent to the unsuccessful lead single release from Reach for the Sky, "Ain't Too Proud", "Arms of Mary" had a spring 1976 single release in both the UK and the US, affording the Sutherland Brothers and Quiver their UK chart debut. A Top of the Pops performance broadcast 8 May 1976 helped boost the track ten notches to No. 6 on the UK Singles Chart dated 15 May 1976 with a No. 5 peak the following week. "Arms of Mary" was also an international success, most notably in Ireland and the Netherlands - in which the track was No. 1 for respectively four and three weeks in those territories - with the track also spending two weeks at No. 1 on the Dutch charts for Belgium.

However, "Arms of Mary" did not afford the Sutherland Brothers the American hit in hopes of which they'd moved to CBS Records, as the track failed to accrue enough interest to rise higher than No. 81 on the Billboard Hot 100 in April 1976.

Chilliwack version

In 1978, Canadian band Chilliwack remade "Arms of Mary" for the group's seventh album release, which was entitled Lights from the Valley after the song's opening lyric. The album's lead single, "Arms of Mary" was recorded by Chilliwack at the suggestion of Marc Gilutin who had been recruited by Mushroom Records to co-produce the group after Mushroom had rejected two distinct sets of tracks - self-produced and self-penned by Chilliwack - which the group had submitted for potential release as their seventh album.

Lights from the Valley would be the only Chilliwack album not entirely self-produced by the group, and "Arms of Mary" would be the first (and it would prove only) non-original song to serve as a Chilliwack single release since the band had been rebranded from "The Collectors". Chilliwack mainstay Bill Henderson would recall he and his bandmates being unhappy with an "outside song" being a Chilliwack single: (Bill Henderson quote:) "All musicians have played other people’s songs [but] once you['ve launched a] recording career...you're supposed to do it yourself. That was something the Beatles started." Chilliwack would only ever record one other song not penned by a group member: "In Love With A Look" (Myers/ Jalananda) also featured on Lights from the Valley.

Reportedly "Arms of Mary" was playlisted by every key Canadian AM radio station with the exception of the most influential: CHUM-AM in Toronto  whose disinterest would factor into the track's failure to become one of Chilliwack's most successful Canadian chart hits with a modest No. 49 peak. "Arms of Mary" would however become the fourth Chilliwack single to rank on the Hot 100 in Billboard with its No. 67 peak outranking the band's three previous Hot 100 entries. "Arms of Mary" would remain Chilliwack's last Hot 100 entry until 26 September 1981 when "My Girl (Gone, Gone, Gone)" debuted at No. 81: by its third week on the chart - that of 10 October 1981 - "My Girl..." had bested "Arms of Mary" as Chilliwack's highest ranking Hot 100 entry, "My Girl..."'s 10 October 1981 Hot 100 ranking being No. 60, with its eventual No. 22 peak setting up "My Girl... to remain Chilliwack's best-ever Hot 100 showing.

A live version of "Arms of Mary" appears on There and Back - Live a 2003 concert album by a latterday incarnation of Chilliwack fronted by Bill Henderson, who in 2022 would state he no longer nursed misgivings over "Arms of Mary"'s inclusion in the Chilliwack oeuvre: (Bill Henderson quote:) "It's a really nice song and people love it and I enjoy playing it."

Other versions
"Arms of Mary" has also been recorded by Lady Flash (Beauties in the Night 1976), October Cherries (World Hits '76 1976), the Everly Brothers (Born Yesterday 1985), Keith Urban (Keith Urban 1991), Piet Veerman (In Between 1992, duet with Mell, 2014), Leo Kottke (Peculiaroso 1994), Boyzone (Said and Done 1995), Smokie (Uncovered 2000), Dominic Kirwan (Under Your Spell 2002), Kevin Kennedy (Present Kennedy 2002), Jan Keizer (Going Back in Time II 2004), Nicholis Louw (My Hart Is Aan Die Brand 2004), Janne Önnerud & Co (Kryddboden 1978) and Wisex (Miss Decibel 1978). The New Pornographers included "Arms of Mary" on their 2007 EP Spirit of Giving placing the song in tandem with "Looking at a Baby" - recorded by Chilliwack in their earlier incarnation as the Collectors - and presenting the track as a Christmas song. In 2012, the Minus 5 recorded a version for a fundraising CD titled Super Hits of the Seventies for radio station WFMU. German techno band Scooter released their own version called "Mary Got No Lamb" in 2016, from their album Ace.

Translated versions of the song include "Ich seh' dich mit meinen Augen", a 1976 single by German singer Rebekka, "Marys arme" on the 1977 album Din Sang by Bamse, "Naisen verran" on the 1977 album Enkelit on harvinasta riistaa by Seppo Närhi, "Laat me in je armen rusten" on the 2007 album Hommage III by Mama's Jasje, and "Sandy" on the 2015 album Gisteren wordt vandaag by Willy Sommers.

Charts
Sutherland Brothers and Quiver version

Chilliwack version

Piet Veerman version

Notes

References

1975 songs
1976 singles
1978 singles
The Sutherland Brothers songs
Quiver (band) songs
Chilliwack (band) songs
Keith Urban songs
Dutch Top 40 number-one singles
Irish Singles Chart number-one singles
CBS Records singles
EMI Records singles
1970s ballads
Folk ballads
Rock ballads